Daniel Omielańczuk (born August 31, 1982) is a Polish professional mixed martial artist and kickboxer currently competing in the Heavyweight division of Konfrontacja Sztuk Walki (KSW). A professional MMA competitor since 2009, he has competed for the UFC, Absolute Championship Akhmat, and Konfrontacja Sztuk Walki. He is currently ranked #3 in the KSW Heavyweight rankings.

Mixed martial arts career

Early career
Omielańczuk made his professional debut in 2009, competing primarily in regional promotions across the Eastern Europe, including KSW, where he compiled a record of 15–3 before signing with the UFC in the spring of 2013.

Ultimate Fighting Championship
Omielańczuk made his promotional debut against fellow newcomer Nandor Guelmino on September 21, 2013 at UFC 165.  After a back and forth first two rounds, Omielańczuk won the fight via knockout in the third round.

Omielańczuk faced Jared Rosholt on April 19, 2014 at UFC Fight Night 39. Rosholt defeated Omielańczuk via unanimous decision.
 
Omielańczuk was expected to face Soa Palelei on November 8, 2014 at UFC Fight Night 55.  However, Omielańczuk was forced to pull out of bout with a broken thumb and was replaced by Walt Harris.

Omielańczuk faced Anthony Hamilton on April 11, 2015 at UFC Fight Night 64. Omielańczuk lost the fight by unanimous decision.

Omielańczuk was expected to face Konstantin Erokhin on July 18, 2015 at UFC Fight Night 72.  However, Erokhin pulled out of the fight in late June citing an injury and was replaced by promotional newcomer Chris de la Rocha. He won the fight via TKO in the first round.

Omielańczuk faced Jarjis Danho on February 27, 2016 at UFC Fight Night 84. He won the fight via technical majority decision after Danho was hit with an inadvertent groin strike in the third round that rendered him unable to continue.

Omielańczuk next faced Alexey Oleynik on July 13, 2016 at UFC Fight Night 91. He won the fight via majority decision.

Omielańczuk faced Stefan Struve on October 8, 2016 at UFC 204. He lost the back and forth fight via submission in the second round.

Omielańczuk faced Timothy Johnson on March 18, 2017 at UFC Fight Night 107. He lost the back and forth fight by split decision.

Omielańczuk faced Curtis Blaydes on July 8, 2017 at UFC 213. He lost the fight by unanimous decision.

Absolute Championship Berkut 
After his third consecutive loss, Omielanczuk was released from the UFC. He later signed with Absolute Championship Berkut, competing against American Bobby Brents at ACB 83: Baku in 2018. He won via first-round submission. After picking up a unanimous decision win in the regional kickboxing circuit, Omielanczuk returned to MMA to face Amir Aliakbari at ACB 89: Krasnodar in September 2018. He was defeated via unanimous decision.

Since the loss to Aliakbari, Omielanczuk has won his last four fights pushing him to 5-1 after leaving the UFC. He fought for the vacant ACA Heavyweight Championship against Tony Johnson at ACA 114: Omielańczuk vs. Johnson. He lost the fight by KO in the first round, marking the first time he has ever lost by strikes.

Omielańczuk faced Daniel James on April 23, 2021 at ACA 122. He won the bout via unanimous decision.

Omielańczuk faced Evgeny Goncharov on September 11, 2021 at ACA 128. He lost the bout via TKO in the third round.

Omielańczuk faced Adam Bogatyrev on February 26, 2022 at ACA 136: Bukuev vs Akopyan. He lost the bout via unanimous decision.

Konfrontacja Sztuk Walki 
Omielańczuk faced Ricardo Prasel at KSW 70 on May 28, 2022. He lost the bout via ankle lock in the first round.

Omielańczuk faced Michal Martínek on October 14, 2022 at KSW 75: Ruchała vs. Stasiak. He controversially won via split decision, with KSW paying  Martinek his show money + his contractual bonus and, upon an official appeal from Martinek’s Team submitted, a full independent review of the decision was undertaken.

Omielańczuk faced Michał Kita on February 25, 2023 at KSW 79, losing the bout via ground and pound TKO in the third round.

Mixed martial arts record

|-
|Loss
|align=center| 26–14–1 (1)
|Michał Kita
|TKO (punches)
|KSW 79: De Fries vs. Duffee
|
|align=center|3
|align=center|2:06
|Liberec, Czech Republic
|
|-
|-
|Win
|align=center|26–13–1 (1)
|Michal Martínek
|Decision (split)
|KSW 75: Ruchała vs. Stasiak
|
|align=center|3
|align=center|5:00
|Nowy Sącz, Poland
|
|-
|Loss
|align=center|25–13–1 (1)
|Ricardo Prasel
|Submission (ankle lock)
|KSW 70: Pudzianowski vs. Materla
|
|align=center|1
|align=center|2:01
|Łódź, Poland
|
|-
| Loss
| align=center|25–12–1 (1)
| Adam Bogatyrev
| Decision (unanimous)
|ACA 136: Bukuev vs Akopyan
|
|align=center|3
|align=center|5:00
|Moscow, Russia
|
|-
| Loss
| align=center|25–11–1 (1)
| Evgeny Goncharov
| TKO (punches)
|ACA 128: Goncharov vs. Omielańczuk
|
|align=center|3
|align=center|1:39
|Minsk, Belarus
|
|-
| Win
| align=center|25–10–1 (1)
| Daniel James
| Decision (unanimous)
|ACA 122: Johnson vs. Poberezhets
|
|align=center|3
|align=center|5:00
|Minsk, Belarus
| 
|-
| Loss
| align=center|24–10–1 (1)
| Tony Johnson
| KO (punch)
|ACA 114: Omielańczuk vs. Johnson
|
|align=center|1
|align=center|1:09
|Łódź, Poland
| 
|-
| Win
| align=center|24–9–1 (1)
| Tomas Pakutinskas
| TKO (retirement)
| ACA 109: Strus vs. Haratyk
| 
| align=center|1
| align=center|5:00
| Łódź, Poland
| 
|-
|Win
|align=center|23–9–1 (1)
|Denis Smoldarev
|KO (elbow)
|ACA 101: Omielańczuk vs. Smoldarev
|
|align=center|1
|align=center|4:40
|Warsaw, Poland
|  
|-
|Win
|align=center|22–9–1 (1)
|Evgeny Erokhin
|TKO (punches)
|ACA 96: Goncharov vs. Johnson
|
|align=center|1
|align=center|1:33
|Lodz, Poland
|  
|-
|Win
|align=center|21–9–1 (1)
|Zelimkhan Umiev
|Decision (unanimous)
|ACA 92: Yagshimuradov vs. Celiński
|
|align=center|3
|align=center|5:00
|Warsaw, Poland
|  
|-
|Loss
|align=center|20–9–1 (1)
|Amir Aliakbari
|Decision (unanimous)
|ACB 89: Abdulvakhabov vs. Bagov 3
|
|align=center|3
|align=center|5:00
|Krasnodar, Russia
|  
|-
|Win
|align=center|20–8–1 (1)
|Bobby Brents
|Submission (neck crank)
|ACB 83: Borisov vs. Kerimov
|
|align=center|1
|align=center|2:45
|Baku, Azerbaijan
|  
|-
|Loss
|align=center|19–8–1 (1)
|Curtis Blaydes
|Decision (unanimous)
|UFC 213 
|
|align=center|3
|align=center|5:00
|Las Vegas, Nevada, United States
|
|-
|Loss
|align=center|19–7–1 (1)
|Timothy Johnson
|Decision (split)
|UFC Fight Night: Manuwa vs. Anderson
|
|align=center|3
|align=center|5:00
|London, England
| 
|-
|Loss
|align=center|19–6–1 (1)
|Stefan Struve
|Submission (D'Arce choke)
|UFC 204
|
|align=center|2
|align=center|1:41
|Manchester, England
|
|-
|Win
|align=center|19–5–1 (1)
|Aleksei Oleinik
|Decision (majority)
|UFC Fight Night: McDonald vs. Lineker
|
|align=center|3
|align=center|5:00
|Sioux Falls, South Dakota, United States
|  
|-
|Win
|align=center|18–5–1 (1)
|Jarjis Danho
|Technical Decision (majority)
|UFC Fight Night: Silva vs. Bisping
|
|align=center|3
|align=center|1:31
|London, England
|
|-
|Win
|align=center|17–5–1 (1)
|Chris de la Rocha
|TKO (punches)
|UFC Fight Night: Bisping vs. Leites 
|
|align=center|1 
|align=center|0:48
|Glasgow, Scotland
|
|-
|Loss
|align=center|16–5–1 (1)
|Anthony Hamilton
|Decision (unanimous)
|UFC Fight Night: Gonzaga vs. Cro Cop 2
|
|align=center|3
|align=center|5:00
|Kraków, Poland
|
|-
| Loss
|align=center| 16–4–1 (1)
| Jared Rosholt
| Decision (unanimous)
| UFC Fight Night: Nogueira vs. Nelson
| 
|align=center| 3
|align=center| 5:00
| Abu Dhabi, United Arab Emirates
|
|-
| Win
|align=center| 16–3–1 (1)
|  Nandor Guelmino
| KO (punch)
| UFC 165
| 
|align=center| 3
|align=center| 3:18
| Toronto, Ontario, Canada
|
|-
| Win
|align=center| 15–3–1 (1)
|  David Tkeshelashvili
| Decision (unanimous)
| ECSF 2
| 
|align=center| 3
|align=center| 5:00
| Nakhichevan, Azerbaijan
| 
|-
| Win
|align=center| 14–3–1 (1)
|  Farrukh Mammadiev
| Submission (north-south choke)
| rowspan="2"|Warrior's Honor 2
| rowspan="2"|
|align=center| 1
|align=center| N/A
| rowspan="2"|Kharkiv, Ukraine
| 
|-
| Win
|align=center| 13–3–1 (1)
|  Tadas Miceika
| Submission (kimura)
|align=center| 1
|align=center| N/A
| 
|-
| Win
|align=center| 12–3–1 (1)
|  Julian Bogdanov
| Submission (arm-triangle choke)
| ECSF: Kolomyia Cup
| 
|align=center| 1
|align=center| 3:06
| Kolomyia, Ukraine
| 
|-
| Win
|align=center| 11–3–1 (1)
|  Evgeniy Timanovskiy
| Submission (rear-naked choke)
| rowspan="2"|Warrior's Honor 
| rowspan="2"|
|align=center| 2
|align=center| 1:54
| rowspan="2"|Kharkiv, Ukraine
| 
|-
| Win
|align=center| 10–3–1 (1)
|  Yuri Gorbenko
| Submission (americana)
|align=center| 2
|align=center| 2:24
| 
|-
| Win
|align=center| 9–3–1 (1)
|  Ivan Bogdanov
| Submission (americana)
| ECSF 1
| 
|align=center| 1
|align=center| 0:17
| Kyiv, Ukraine
| 
|-
| Win
|align=center| 8–3–1 (1)
|  Vladimir Abdulov
| Submission (north-south choke)
| IFC: Winner Punch 2
| 
|align=center| 1
|align=center| 1:58
| Piła, Poland
| 
|-
| Win
|align=center| 7–3–1 (1)
|  Ivan Gayvanovich 
| Submission (kimura)
| West Fight 3
| 
|align=center| 1
|align=center| 1:54
| Ternopil, Ukraine
| 
|-
| Win
|align=center| 6–3–1 (1)
|  Dayman Lake
| Decision (unanimous)
| Bushido Lithuania 47
| 
|align=center| 3
|align=center| 5:00
| London, England
| 
|-
| Win
|align=center| 5–3–1 (1)
|  Jakub Beresiński
| KO (head kick)
| ASP: Champions Night
| 
|align=center| 1
|align=center| 2:29
| Koszalin, Poland
| 
|-
| Loss
|align=center| 4–3–1 (1)
| Michał Włodarek
| Decision (split)
| VAC: Victory and Glory
| 
|align=center| 2
|align=center| 5:00
| Siedlce, Poland
| 
|-
| Draw
|align=center| 4–2–1 (1)
|  Dmitry Poberezhets 
| Draw
| Fight on the East
| 
|align=center| 3
|align=center| 3:00
| Rzeszów, Poland
| 
|-
| Win
|align=center| 4–2 (1)
|  Piotr Mliński
| Decision (unanimous)
| IFC: Winner Punch
| 
|align=center| 3
|align=center| 5:00
| Bydgoszcz, Poland
| 
|-
| Win
|align=center| 3–2 (1)
|  Patryk Gaca
| Decision (unanimous)
| Fight Night Łobez
| 
|align=center| 2
|align=center| 5:00
| Łobez, Poland
| 
|-
| Win
|align=center| 2–2 (1)
|  Błażej Wójcik
| Submission (rear-naked choke)
| Pro Fight 5
| 
|align=center| 1
|align=center| 1:29
| Wrocław, Poland
| 
|-
|NC
|align=center| 1–2 (1)
|  Michał Gutowski 
| NC (illegal soccer kick)
| Iron Fist 2
| 
|align=center| 2
|align=center| 2:46
| Szczecin, Poland
| 
|-
| Loss
|align=center| 1–2 
|  David Oliva
| Decision (unanimous)
| rowspan="2"|KSW 12 
| rowspan="2"|
|align=center| 2
|align=center| 5:00
| rowspan="2"|Warsaw, Poland
| 
|-
| Loss
|align=center| 1–1
|  Konstantin Gluhov 
| Decision (majority)
|align=center| 2
|align=center| 5:00
| 
|-
| Win
|align=center| 1–0
|  Karol Celiński
| Decision (unanimous)
| FCK: Łobez
| 
|align=center| 2
|align=center| 5:00
| Łobez, Poland
| 
|-

See also
 List of male mixed martial artists

References

External links

1982 births
Living people
Polish male mixed martial artists
Heavyweight mixed martial artists
Mixed martial artists utilizing Muay Thai
Mixed martial artists utilizing Brazilian jiu-jitsu
Sportspeople from Warsaw
Ultimate Fighting Championship male fighters
Polish Muay Thai practitioners
Polish practitioners of Brazilian jiu-jitsu